Terence Joseph Nation (8 August 19309 March 1997) was a Welsh screenwriter and novelist. Especially known for his work in British television science fiction, he created the Daleks and Davros for Doctor Who, as well as the series Survivors and Blake's 7.

Nation first made his name as a comedy writer before becoming a prolific writer for drama, working on many of the most popular British series of the 1960s and 1970s, such as The Avengers, The Baron, The Champions, Department S, The Persuaders! and The Saint. When Nation was commissioned to write The Daleks (1963) for Doctor Who, the villainous eponymous creatures established the series' early popularity. He later devised the recurring character of Davros in Genesis of the Daleks (1975). His series Survivors and Blake's 7 have been described as "much-loved cult TV classics".

Life and career

Early years
Born in Llandaff, Cardiff, Wales, Nation initially worked in comedy, entering the industry in 1955 after a (possibly apocryphal) incident in which Spike Milligan bought a sketch that he had written because he thought that Nation appeared hungry. 

During the 1950s, Nation worked with John Junkin and Johnny Speight for the writers' agency Associated London Scripts, where he collaborated on hundreds of radio plays for comedians such as Terry Scott, Eric Sykes, Harry Worth and Frankie Howerd.

His career break came in 1962, when he was commissioned to write material for Tony Hancockfirst for Hancock's unsuccessful series for Associated Television broadcast on ITV in 1963, and then his stage show. Although Nation accompanied Hancock as his chief screenwriter on tour in 1963, Hancock would regularly neglect Nation's scripts in favour of recycling his old material. Following an argument over this, Hancock either sacked Nation, or Nation resigned (it is unclear which).

Doctor Who
Prior to his association with Hancock, Nation had declined an offer from scriptwriter David Whitaker to write for a new science-fiction programme that was entering production at the BBC; Whitaker had been impressed by a script that Nation had written for the ABC anthology series Out of this World. Now unemployed, and with a young family to support, Nation contacted Whitaker and accepted the offer, writing the second Doctor Who serial, The Daleks (also known as The Mutants and The Dead Planet). The serial introduced the eponymous extraterrestrial villains that would quickly become the series' most popular and enduring monsters, and resulted in a major merchandising success for the BBC.

Nation contributed further scripts to Doctor Who. In 1965, he and Dennis Spooner co-wrote the 12-part serial The Daleks' Master Plan, after which Nation, who still held the copyright to the Daleks, attempted to launch a Dalek spin-off TV series in the United States. Various other Dalek tie-in material appeared, including comic strips in the children's weekly TV Century 21 and annuals; such material was frequently credited to Nation, even when written by others. Over the next few years, appearances by the Daleks in Doctor Who became less frequent and were written by other authors (Whitaker wrote The Power of the Daleks (1966) and The Evil of the Daleks (1967), and Louis Marks wrote Day of the Daleks (1972)).

In 1973, following an eight-year absence from the series, Nation returned to writing for the Daleks on Doctor Who with the Third Doctor serial Planet of the Daleks. In 1998, readers of Doctor Who Magazine voted Nation's 1975 serial Genesis of the Daleks the greatest Doctor Who story of all time. In the story, Nation introduced the character of Davros, the creator of the Daleks, who went on to appear in further storylines. Nation also wrote two non-Dalek scripts for Doctor Who, The Keys of Marinus in 1964, which introduced the Voord, and The Android Invasion in 1975, which introduced the Kraals. Nation's final script for Doctor Who was Destiny of the Daleks, broadcast in 1979.

His work on Doctor Who was the subject of the documentary Terror Nation, a special feature on the BBC DVD release of Destiny of the Daleks.

Out of the Unknown
Nation's first work on the science-fiction anthology series Out of the Unknown was scripting an adaptation of Ray Bradbury's short story The Fox and the Forest in 1965 for the show's debut series. It was about a 21st-century couple taking a forbidden trip to Mexico in 1938, only to be followed by enforcers from the future. It is one of only two episodes from the first series to be considered lost, with only two photographs and the end titles known to exist.

In 1969, when the show began to be produced in colour, Nation granted permission for the Daleks to be used in the series three episode Get Off My Cloud, based on the story by Peter Phillips about a bed-bound science-fiction author who finds himself within one of his own fantasies after a mental breakdown. This would be the first time the Daleks had been shown in colour on television, although they had previously appeared in colour in the Peter Cushing films. Only production stills and low-quality audio extracts survive.

Survivors and Blake's 7
Having returned to writing for Doctor Who, the BBC commissioned Nation to create a new science-fiction drama series. First broadcast in 1975, Survivors is the post-apocalyptic story of the last humans on Earth after the world's population has been devastated by plague. Although the series was well received, Nation's creative vision conflicted with that of producer Terence Dudley, and the final two seasons were produced without Nation's involvement.

Meanwhile, screenwriter Brian Clemens claimed that he had related the concept for Survivors to Nation in the late 1960s while they were working together on the final season of The Avengers, with Clemens claiming to have registered the Survivors concept with the Writers' Guild of Great Britain in 1965; Nation denied the allegations. Although the case was ultimately brought before the High Court, both sides withdrew from the proceedings after their legal costs mounted.

The production of Nation's next BBC creation, Blake's 7, experienced fewer problems. This series follows a group of criminals and political prisoners who are on the run from the evil "Terran Federation", piloting a stolen spaceship of unknown origin. Blake's 7 ran for four series from 1978 to 1981. Although Nation scripted the whole of the first season of Blake's 7, his creative influence subsequently declined in the following two seasons despite writing some key episodes, as script editor Chris Boucher exerted a greater influence on those seasons. Nation didn't write any episodes in the fourth season of Blake's 7. In the 1980s, Nation attempted, without success, to secure funding for a fifth season of Blake's 7.

During the 1970s, Nation wrote a children's novel for his daughter Rebecca (after whom he named the character of Rebec in the 1973 Doctor Who serial Planet of the Daleks) titled Rebecca's World: Journey to the Forbidden Planet, as well as a novel based on Survivors.

United States
In 1980, Nation moved to Los Angeles, where he developed programme ideas and worked for various production studios. Little of his work from this time was as successful as that of his earlier period in Britain. He wrote scripts for the TV series MacGyver (1985) and A Fine Romance (1989).

Death
Nation died from emphysema in Los Angeles on 9 March 1997, aged 66. Shortly before his death, he had been collaborating with actor Paul Darrow on another attempt to revive Blake's 7.

Writing credits

Awards and nominations

In 2013, Nation was commemorated with a blue plaque at the house in Cardiff where he was born.

Bibliography
Survivors (1976)
Rebecca's World: Journey to the Forbidden Planet (1978)

References

Further reading
 Turner, Alwyn W.: The Man Who Invented The Daleks: The Strange Worlds of Terry Nation, London: Aurum Press, 2011, .

External links
 
 
 
 Terry Nation profile, Museum of Broadcast Communications, museum.tv; accessed 26 December 2014.

1930 births
1997 deaths
20th-century British male writers
20th-century British novelists
20th-century British screenwriters
BBC people
British male novelists
British male screenwriters
British male television writers
British science fiction writers
Deaths from emphysema
People from Llandaff
Welsh comedy writers
Welsh expatriates in the United States
Welsh novelists
Welsh radio writers
Welsh science fiction writers
Welsh screenwriters
Welsh television writers
Writers from Cardiff